Grant is a former rural locality in the Barcaldine Region, Queensland, Australia.

On 22 November 2019 the Queensland Government decided to amalgamate the localities in the Barcaldine Region, resulting in five expanded localities based on the larger towns: Alpha, Aramac, Barcaldine, Jericho and Muttaburra. Grant was mostly incorporated into Barcaldine, except for the eastern corner which was incorporated into Jericho.

Geography 
The Capricorn Highway and, to its immediate south, Central Western railway line pass through the locality from east (Garfield/Mexico) to the west (Barcaldine).

The Alice River flows through the locality from the north-east (Garfield) to the south-west (Barcaldine).

The undeveloped town of Alice is within Grant, located along the Central Western railway line.

Education 
There are no schools in Grant. The nearest primary schools are in Barcaldine and Jericho. The nearest secondary school is in Barcaldine.

References 

Barcaldine Region
Unbounded localities in Queensland